Helen Miller (born 1945) is an American politician who served as a member of the Iowa House of Representatives from 2003 to 2019.

Education
Miller was born in Newark, New Jersey, and attended South Side High School (now Malcolm X Shabazz High School). She graduated from Howard University in Washington, D.C. with a Bachelor of Arts in business administration and was initiated as a member of Delta Sigma Theta sorority. She later earned a Master of Science in library sciences from Our Lady of the Lake University in San Antonio, Texas. She earned her Juris Doctor from the Georgetown University Law Center.

Career
In the Iowa House of Representatives, Miller served on several committees, including the Economic Growth, Natural Resources, and Transportation committees. She also serves as the ranking member of the Agriculture Committee. Her political experience includes serving as an assistant minority leader in the Iowa House (2005–2006) and an assistant majority leader.

References

External links

 Representative Helen Miller official Iowa General Assembly site
 Helen Miller State Representative official constituency site
 Member Profile: Helen Miller Iowa House of Representatives: House Democrats
 
 Financial information (state office) at the National Institute for Money in State Politics

Democratic Party members of the Iowa House of Representatives
1945 births
Date of birth missing (living people)
Living people
Howard University alumni
Georgetown University Law Center alumni
Politicians from Newark, New Jersey
Iowa lawyers
African-American state legislators in Iowa
African-American women in politics
Lawyers from Washington, D.C.
Women state legislators in Iowa
Politicians from Fort Dodge, Iowa
Our Lady of the Lake University alumni
Lawyers from Newark, New Jersey
Malcolm X Shabazz High School alumni
21st-century American politicians
21st-century American women politicians
21st-century African-American women
21st-century African-American politicians
20th-century African-American people
20th-century African-American women
Iowa Women's Hall of Fame Inductees